Purnell is an unincorporated community in Wake County, North Carolina, United States, located  northwest of Wake Forest.

Purnell and Bud Smith Roads are at the center of the community.

Nearby neighborhoods are Kensington Manor, Crenshaw Manor, Galloway, and Hillcrest Farms.

References

Unincorporated communities in Wake County, North Carolina
Unincorporated communities in North Carolina